Rovaniemi sub-region is a subdivision of Finnish Lapland and one of the Sub-regions of Finland since 2009.

Municipalities
 Ranua
 Rovaniemi

Politics
Results of the 2018 Finnish presidential election:

 Sauli Niinistö   59.0%
 Paavo Väyrynen   11.8%
 Pekka Haavisto   10.4%
 Laura Huhtasaari   6.4%
 Matti Vanhanen   6.0%
 Merja Kyllönen   3.6%
 Tuula Haatainen   2.4%
 Nils Torvalds   0.4%

Sub-regions of Finland
Lapland (Finland)